Wendell Lynn Smallwood Jr. (born January 20, 1994) is an American football running back who is a free agent. He played college football at West Virginia and was selected in the fifth round of the 2016 NFL Draft by the Philadelphia Eagles. Smallwood has also been a member of the Washington Redskins, Pittsburgh Steelers, and Jacksonville Jaguars.

Early years
Smallwood attended Red Lion Christian Academy in Bear, Delaware before transferring to Eastern Christian Academy in Elkton, Maryland for his senior year. He was rated by Rivals.com as a three-star recruit. He received offers from West Virginia, Boston College, Connecticut, Hawaii, Rutgers, and Temple. He chose to commit to West Virginia University (WVU) to play college football.

College career
As a true freshman at West Virginia in 2013, Smallwood played in 12 games and rushed for 221 yards on 39 carries with one touchdown. He also served as a kick returner, returning 30 kickoffs for a total of 541 yards. As a sophomore, he played in all 13 games and made nine starts. He had 722 rushing yards on 148 carries and two touchdowns. He also recorded 31 receptions, fifth most in school history for a single season. As a junior in 2015, Smallwood rushed for a Big 12-leading 1,519 yards on 238 carries with nine touchdowns. With 2,462 rushing yards in his collegiate career, he finished ninth in school history. After the season, he decided to forego his senior season and entered the 2016 NFL Draft. While at West Virginia, he majored in criminology with a minor in communications.

Career statistics

Professional career

Philadelphia Eagles

Smallwood was selected by the Philadelphia Eagles in the fifth round of the 2016 NFL Draft with the 153rd overall pick. He signed his rookie four-year contract on May 4, 2016.

On September 25, 2016, Smallwood scored his first career rushing touchdown in a 34–3 win against the Pittsburgh Steelers. Due to an ankle injury limiting starter Ryan Mathews to only two carries, Smallwood was the featured back for the Eagles, recording 89 yards and the touchdown on 17 carries. In Week 6 against the Washington Redskins, he scored his first kickoff return touchdown and the NFL's first kickoff return touchdown of the season. He was placed on injured reserve on December 12, 2016, finishing his rookie season with 312 rushing yards and a touchdown.

In the 2017 season, Smallwood finished with 174 rushing yards, one rushing touchdown, 13 receptions, and 103 receiving yards. During his second year in the NFL, the Eagles defeated the New England Patriots by a score of 41-33, giving them their first Super Bowl championship in franchise history.

In the 2018 season, Smallwood continued to share a deep backfield. In Week 3, he scored his first rushing touchdown of the season against the Indianapolis Colts. Overall, he finished the 2018 season with 364 rushing yards, three rushing touchdowns, 28 receptions, 230 receiving yards, and two receiving touchdowns. The Eagles made the playoffs as the #6-seed. In the Wild Card Round against the Chicago Bears, he had 20 rushing yards and 20 receiving yards in the 16–15 victory. In the Divisional Round against the New Orleans Saints, he had 33 rushing yards and a six-yard reception in the 20–14 loss.

Smallwood was waived during final roster cuts on August 31, 2019.

Washington Redskins

On September 1, 2019, Smallwood was claimed off waivers by the Washington Redskins. In the 2019 season, he appeared in 15 games and recorded 22 carries for 81 rushing yards to go along with nine receptions for 64 receiving yards.

Pittsburgh Steelers
On July 28, 2020, Smallwood signed with the Pittsburgh Steelers. He was waived on September 5, 2020, and re-signed to the practice squad two days later. He was elevated to the active roster on December 2 for the team's week 12 game against the Baltimore Ravens, and reverted to the practice squad after the game. His practice squad contract with the team expired after the season on January 18, 2021.

Jacksonville Jaguars
On October 6, 2021, Smallwood was signed by the Jacksonville Jaguars to the practice squad. He was released on October 12.

Washington Football Team
On November 2, 2021, Smallwood was signed to the Washington Football Team's practice squad.

NFL career statistics

Personal life
Smallwood is the son of Nichelle Barber and Wendell Smallwood. Growing up, he was a Philadelphia Eagles fan, his favorite player being Duce Staley, who became his position coach upon Smallwood being drafted by the Eagles.

In July 2014, Smallwood was arrested in Delaware on charges of witness tampering. Smallwood was accused of trying to get a witness to recant statements they made implicating a friend of Smallwood's, Zakee Lloyd, charged with first-degree murder. Two weeks later, the charges against Smallwood were dropped when Lloyd pleaded guilty to second-degree murder.

References

External links

 
 West Virginia Mountaineers bio

1994 births
Living people
Players of American football from Wilmington, Delaware
American football running backs
West Virginia Mountaineers football players
Philadelphia Eagles players
Washington Redskins players
Pittsburgh Steelers players
Jacksonville Jaguars players
Washington Football Team players